"Rewrite the Stars" is a song performed by Zac Efron and Zendaya for the film The Greatest Showman (2017). It was released on November 17, 2017 by Atlantic Records as a promotional single from The Greatest Showman: Original Motion Picture Soundtrack. In Australia, "Rewrite the Stars" was released to radio on July 20, 2018. The song sees Efron's character, Phillip, serenading Zendaya's character, Anne, trying to convince her that they're meant to be together, despite their different races.

Composition
According to sheet music published at Sheetmusicdirect.com, "Rewrite the Stars" is a moderately fast tempo of 125 beats per minute. Written in common time, the song is in the key of B major. Throughout the track, Efron's vocal range spans from the low note of E3 to the high note of B4, and Zendaya's vocal range spans from the low note of E3 to the high note of E5. "Rewrite the Stars" had many melodic inspirations, most notably being "Unconditionally" by Katy Perry, produced by Dr. Luke, Max Martin, and Cirkut.

Reception

Sam Damshenas from GayTimes called the song a "stunning duet" with perfectly fitting romance, and Michael Ordoña from the Los Angeles Times called the song "a standout duet" and "a signature karaoke duet". However, Emily Yoshida from Vulture described the song as a "Jason Derulo castoff circa 2012."

Accolades

Charts

Weekly charts

Year-end charts

Certifications

Release history

Reimagined version

On November 16, 2018, The Greatest Showman: Reimagined was released, which features a cover of "Rewrite the Stars" by English singers James Arthur and Anne-Marie as a single. The pair performed the song on the fifteenth season of British The X Factor on December 1 and the fifteenth season of American The Voice on December 4. It was released to Australian radio, and a remix by Wideboys was released on December 14.

Track listing
Remix
"Rewrite the Stars"  – 3:36

Charts

Year-end charts

Certifications

References

2010s ballads
2017 songs
2018 songs
2018 singles
Anne-Marie (singer) songs
Atlantic Records singles
James Arthur songs
Male–female vocal duets
Number-one singles in Singapore
Pop ballads
Song recordings produced by Greg Wells
Songs written by Justin Paul (songwriter)
Songs written by Benj Pasek
Songs written for films
Songs from The Greatest Showman
Songs from Pasek and Paul musicals
Zac Efron songs
Zendaya songs
Love themes